A charley horse is a painful involuntary cramp in the legs and/or foot, lasting anywhere from a few seconds to a day. The term formerly referred more commonly to bruising of the quadriceps muscle of the anterior or lateral thigh, or contusion of the femur, that commonly results in a haematoma and sometimes several weeks of pain and disability. In this latter sense, such an injury is known as dead leg. 

Dead legs and charley horses are two different types of injuries: A charley horse involves the muscles contracting without warning, and can last from a few seconds to a few days. A dead leg often occurs in contact sports, such as football when an athlete suffers a knee (blunt trauma) to the lateral quadriceps causing a haematoma or temporary paresis and antalgic gait as a result of pain.

Colloquially, taking a hit in the thigh area (thigh contusion) can also be referred to as a charley horse or even simply a charley.

Cause
Charley horses have many possible causes directly resulting from high or low pH or substrate concentrations in the blood, including hormonal imbalances, dehydration, low levels of magnesium, potassium, or calcium (evidence has been mixed), side effects of medication, or, more seriously, diseases such as amyotrophic lateral sclerosis and neuropathy. They are also a common complaint during pregnancy.

Treatment
Relief is given by massaging or stretching the leg or foot in the opposite direction of the cramp. Relief also comes from standing up, which serves to counter the muscle-tightening signal.

Notes

References

External links 
 

Muscular disorders
Colloquial terms